The Federal University of Amazonas (UFAM) is a public university located in Manaus, Amazonas, Brazil. It is the oldest university in Brazil and one of the largest universities in the northern region of Brazil.

It offers a wide array of degrees, with 645 research groups and 65 graduate courses.

History
The UFAM is the oldest university in Brazil.  It was founded on January 17, 1909 as the Free University School of Manáos, born of the same late-19th century economic boom that gave Manaus its rubber barons.  The school later becoming the University of Manáos.  The economic downturn that followed the collapse of the rubber market, as well as the logistical problems of being located in the Amazon Rainforest, led the school to curtail its academic offerings down to just a law program. On June 12, 1962, Brazilian federal law 4.069-A under the authorship of Senator Arthur Virgílio Jr. reinvigorated the school as the state-owned University of Amazonas. In June 2002, the school was renamed the Federal University of Amazonas.

As of 2017, the rector of UFAM is Professor Sylvio Puga. Famous former students include Eduardo Braga (former governor of Amazonas).

Undergraduate programs
Currently the Federal University of Amazonas is composed of six campuses, holders of different academic calendars. While on the campus of Manaus, the school year begins in the first semester (with the exception of the Physiotherapy course and the SiSU approved group for the Medicine course, which starts in the second semester), in the campus of the interior of the state, the school year begins in the second semester. The following is a list of the campuses and their respective courses offered:

Manaus Campus

Agricultural sciences
 Agronomy
 Forestry Engineering
 Food Engineering 
 Fisheries Engineering 
 Animal Husbandry

Biological Sciences
 Nursing
 Pharmacy
 Physical Education
 Physical Education (Promotion in Health and Leisure)
 Physical Education (Sports Training and Physiotherapy)
 Medicine
 Dentistry
 Biotechnology 
 Biological Sciences 
 Natural Sciences

Exact Sciences
 Architecture and Urban Design
 Civil Engineering
 Computer Engineering
 Electrical Engineering - Electronics
 Electrical Engineering - Electrical Engineering
 Electrical Engineering - Telecommunications
 Production Engineering
 Materials Engineering
 Mechanical Engineering
 Petroleum Engineering and Gas 
 Chemical Engineering
 Statistics
 Physics
 Geology 
 Mathematics
 Applied Mathematics 
 Chemistry
 Computer Science 
 Software Engineering

Humanities
 Law
 Pedagogy
 Administration
 Accounting 
 Economic Sciences
 Psychology
 Social Sciences 
 Philosophy 
 Geography
 History 
 Social Service
 Archivology 
 Librarianship
 Social Communication - Public Relations and Journalism
 Liberal Arts in Spanish Language and Literature
 Liberal Arts in French Language and Literature
 Liberal Arts in English Language and Literature
 Liberal Arts in Japanese Language and Literature
 Liberal Arts in Portuguese Language and Literature
 Liberal Arts in BSL (Brazilian Signal Language, LIBRAS)
 Plastic Arts 
 Music

Benjamin Constant Campus

Located in Benjamin Constant, city of Alto Solimões. Benjamin Constant's Multicampi offers undergraduate courses: Bachelor of Administration, Bachelor of Anthropology, Bachelor of Science in Agrarian Sciences and Environment, Bachelor of Arts in Biology and Chemistry, Bachelor of Arts in Spanish Language and Literature, Letters in Portuguese Language and Literature and Bachelor in Pedagogy.

Coari Campus

Located in Coari. Coari's Multicampi offers the following undergraduate courses: Biotechnology, Bachelor of Science: Biology and Chemistry, Bachelor of Science: Mathematics and Physics, Nursing, Physiotherapy, Medicine and Nutrition.

Humaitá Campus

Located in Humaitá, in the micro-region of Madeira, is the only one located in the South of Amazonas. The Multicampi of Humaitá offers the following undergraduate courses: Degree in Agronomy, Biology, Chemistry, Mathematics, Physics, Environmental Engineering, Letters - English Language and Literature, Letters - Portuguese Language and Literature and Pedagogy.

Itacoatiara Campus

Located in Itacoatiara, city of Greater Manaus. Multicampi of Itacoatiara offers the following undergraduate courses: Agronomy, Pharmaceutical Sciences, Biology, Chemistry, Mathematics, Physics, Production Engineering, Software Engineering, Sanitary Engineering, Industrial Chemistry, Information System.

Parintins Campus

Located in Parintins. Multicampi of Parintins offers the following undergraduate courses: Administration in Organizational Management, Fine Arts, Social Communication - Journalism, Physical Education, Pedagogy, Social Work and Zootechnics.

International partnerships
The University has a partnership with the University of Missouri School of Music in Columbia, Missouri, United States.

Notable alumni
 Eduardo Braga – Brazilian politician
 Vanessa Grazziotin – Brazilian politician
 José Melo – Brazilian politician and former governor of state of Amazonas.
 Malvino Salvador – Brazilian actor
 Larissa Ramos – Brazilian model

See also
Brazil University Rankings
Universities and Higher Education in Brazil

References

External links
Official website (in Portuguese)

 
Amazonas
Manaus
Educational institutions established in 1909
Universities and colleges in Amazonas (Brazilian state)
1909 establishments in Brazil
Buildings and structures in Amazonas (Brazilian state)